The 2019 Asia Rugby Women's Championship Div 1 was held from 19—22 June in Calamba, Philippines. China won the Division 1 Championship after beating the Philippines in the Final. India also created history when they defeated Singapore to record their first test match victory.

China progressed to a play-off with Kazakhstan, which was also a 2021 Women's Rugby World Cup qualifier. The winner was promoted to the 2020 Asia Rugby Women's Championship. The competition will see one team qualify directly for the 2021 Rugby World Cup in New Zealand.

Division 1 Championship

Semi-finals

3rd Place

Final

Promotion Playoff 
Playoff for promotion to the 2020 Asia Rugby Women's Championship.

Kazakhstan advanced after defeating China on aggregate scores in a two-game series in which each team won a match.

References 

2019 in Asian rugby union
2019 in women's rugby union